The 1999 Dura Lube/Big K 400 was the second stock car race of the 1999 NASCAR Winston Cup Series season and the 34th iteration of the event. The race was held on Sunday, February 21, 1999, in Rockingham, North Carolina, at North Carolina Speedway, a  permanent high-banked racetrack. The race took the scheduled 393 laps to complete. In the closing laps of the race, Roush Racing driver Mark Martin would manage to pull away with nine to go to win his 30th career NASCAR Winston Cup Series victory and his first victory of the season. To fill out the podium, Robert Yates Racing driver Dale Jarrett and Joe Gibbs Racing driver Bobby Labonte would finish second and third, respectively.

Background 

North Carolina Speedway was opened as a flat, one-mile oval on October 31, 1965. In 1969, the track was extensively reconfigured to a high-banked, D-shaped oval just over one mile in length. In 1997, North Carolina Motor Speedway merged with Penske Motorsports, and was renamed North Carolina Speedway. Shortly thereafter, the infield was reconfigured, and competition on the infield road course, mostly by the SCCA, was discontinued. Currently, the track is home to the Fast Track High Performance Driving School.

Entry list 

 (R) denotes rookie driver.

Practice

First practice 
The first practice session was held on Friday, February 19, at 10:00 AM EST. The session would last for one hour and 15 minutes.

Second practice 
The second practice session was held on Friday, February 19, at 12:00 PM EST. The session would last for 45 minutes.

Third practice 
The third practice session was held on Saturday, February 20, at 9:00 AM EST. The session would last for 45 minutes.

Final practice 
The third and final practice session, sometimes referred to as Happy Hour, was held on Saturday, February 20, after the preliminary 1999 Alltel 200. The session would last for an hour.

Qualifying 
Qualifying was originally meant to be split into two rounds and ran on Friday, February 19; however, due to rain, qualifying was instead condensed into one round and postponed to Saturday.

Qualifying was held on Saturday, February 20, at 10:45 AM EST. Each driver would have two laps to set a fastest time; the fastest of the two would count as their official qualifying lap. Positions 26-36 would be decided on time, while positions 37-43 would be based on provisionals. Six spots are awarded by the use of provisionals based on owner's points. The seventh is awarded to a past champion who has not otherwise qualified for the race. If no past champion needs the provisional, the next team in the owner points will be awarded a provisional.

Four drivers would fail to qualify: Derrike Cope, Buckshot Jones, Billy Standridge, and Rich Bickle.

Full qualifying results 

*Time not available.

Race results

References 

1999 NASCAR Winston Cup Series
NASCAR races at Rockingham Speedway
February 1999 sports events in the United States
1999 in sports in North Carolina